Avant que l'ombre... à Bercy is Mylène Farmer's 2006 concert tour in support of her sixth studio album, Avant que l'ombre.... It was the fourth tour of the singer. Unlike her previous tours, all 13 concerts took place at Palais Omnisports de Bercy in Paris; "Avant que l'ombre" can therefore be considered as a concert residency rather than a fully fledged tour.

More than 169,000 tickets were sold about a year before the concerts.

Set list

Act I
 Ouverture
 "Peut-être toi"
 "XXL"
 "Dans les rues de Londres"
 "California"
 "Porno graphique" + Outro
Act II
  "Sans contrefaçon"
 "Q.I"
 "C'est une belle journée" + Outro
Act III
  "Ange, parle-moi..."
 "Redonne-moi"
 "Rêver"
 "L'Autre" (Replaced by Ainsi-soit je... on the first 2 dates)
 "Désenchantée"
 "Nobody Knows" + Outro
Act IV
  "Je t'aime mélancolie"
 "L'amour n'est rien..."
 "Déshabillez-moi"
 "Les Mots" (duet with Abraham Laboriel Jr.)
 "Fuck Them All"
Final
  "Avant que l'ombre..."

Additional notes
"Ainsi soit je" was performed on January 13 and January 14 instead of "L'Autre"

Tour dates

There were a total of 13 shows, from January 13 to January 29, 2006, in France only:

Credits and personnel

 Production: Thierry Suc
 Editions: Paul Van Parys for Requiem Publishing
 Design entertainment: Laurent Boutonnat and Mylène Farmer
 Set designer: Mark Fisher (Stufish Co)
 Costumes designed by: Franck Sorbier
 Make-up: Carole Lasnier
 Hair: John Nollet
 Lighting design: Fred Peveri
 Sound: Stéphane Plisson for MAW Society
 Images: Alain Escalle
 Production images: Cheval de Troie
 Musical director: Yvan Cassar
 Vocal coaching: Malcom Walker

 Management: Thierry Suc with de Thomas Blanc
 Musicians: Yvan Cassar, Eric Chevalier (keyboards), Peredur ap Gwynedd (guitar), Milton McDonald (guitar), Paul Bushnell (bass), Nicolas Montazaud (percussions), Abraham Laboriel Jr. (drum kit) 
 Choristers: Esther Dobong'Na Essienne, Johanna Manchec
 Choreographies: Mylène Farmer  Except : "C'est une belle journée": Mylène Farmer and Christophe Danchaud; "Fuck Them All": Mylène Farmer and Los Vivancos.
 Dancers: Ayo Berner Jackson, Christine Dejesus, Khetanya Jati Henderson, Tiffany Howard, Sharaya Howell, Edara Johnson, Christianna Toler, Naimah Willoughby, Los Vivancos
 Photos: Claude Gassian
 First part of the show: The shortfilm "Le conte du monde flottant" by Alain Escalle

Further reading

 Julien Wagner, Jean-François Kowalski, Marianne Rosenstiehl, Claude Gassian, Mylène Farmer: Belle de scène (book on Farmer's tours), K&B Ed, 27 April 2007

References

2006 concert tours
Mylène Farmer concert tours